Coed Cwm Clettwr is a Site of Special Scientific Interest in Ceredigion,  west Wales. It is designated for mature broadleaf woodland.

The alternative spelling Coed Cwm Cletwr appears on a variety of maps over many years, but local usage has Clettwr

See also
List of Sites of Special Scientific Interest in Ceredigion

References

Sites of Special Scientific Interest in Ceredigion